The Division of Corinella was an Australian Electoral Division in Victoria. The division was created in 1990 and abolished in 1996. It was named for the town of Corinella. It was located in the outer south-eastern suburbs of Melbourne and parts of western Gippsland. It included the suburbs of Carrum Downs, Cranbourne and Keysborough and the town of Wonthaggi. It was a marginal seat.

Members

Election results

See also
 Division of Corinella (1901-06)

Former electoral divisions of Australia
Constituencies established in 1990
Constituencies disestablished in 1996
1990 establishments in Australia
1996 disestablishments in Australia